Penostatin A is a cytotoxic metabolite produced by Penicillium.

References

Secondary alcohols
Benzopyrans
Ketones
Cyclopentanes